Permasteelisa S.p.A. is an Italian company in engineering, project management, manufacturing and installation of architectural envelopes and interior systems. In 2011, Permasteelisa was acquired by Japanese Lixil Group for €575 million. In 2020 the Group entered the U.S.-based Atlas’ group of Manufacturing Businesses.

The company has more than 4,500 employees worldwide and a network of 40 companies (including offices, plants and R&D centers) in 30 countries.

History
The company was founded in 1973 with the name of Industria Serramenti in Alluminio (ISA). Its headquarters are in Vittorio Veneto, Province of Treviso. After the acquisition of the Australian company Permasteel Industries Pty Ltd in 1986, which manufactured the curtain wall of the Sydney Opera House, the company's name was changed to Permasteelisa. This acquisition marks the start to international expansion, first into Singapore and Hong Kong, then to Japan, China, Thailand and Malaysia. In 1994, Permasteelisa acquired the Dutch company Scheldebouw B.V. and, in 2001, the German company Josef Gartner GmbH.

At the end of the 1990s, the company entered the United States, first in interiors fit-out and later investing in the curtain wall market.

In 2018, the United States blocked an attempted acquisition of Permasteelisa by Chinese interior design company Grandland from its Japanese owner on unspecified security grounds. It is unclear why the Committee on Foreign Investment in the United States (CFIUS) blocked the transaction.

Management
The chairman of the board is Peter Bacon, and the chief executive officer is Klaus Lother who was elected by the Board of Directors on May 13, 2019.

Subsidiaries
 Permasteelisa North America Corp.
 Scheldebouw B.V.
 Josef Gartner GmbH
 Permasteelisa (UK) Limited
 Permasteelisa France SAS
 Permasteelisa Pacific Holdings Ltd

Finances
As of 31 December 2015, the Permasteelisa Group turnover was €1,528 million. The normalized EBIT was €41 million, representing 2.7% of the sales. The shareholders' equity amounted to €234.69 million, while the net financial position was €-306 million.

Activities
Permasteelisa an examples of a "pocket-sized" multinational, a company with a modest turnover but a worldwide presence. The main area of activity for the Permasteelisa Group is the curtain wall sector. In 2015, the Exteriors Business Unit represented 84.5% of the turnover (83.3% in 2002), the Interiors Business Unit 12.7% and Contract Business Unit 2.8%.

See also

References 

Italian companies established in 1973
Engineering companies of Italy
Construction and civil engineering companies of Italy
Italian brands
Construction and civil engineering companies established in 1973
Lixil Group